Vuelve temprano (English: Come back early) is a 2014 Chilean telenovela produced and broadcast by TVN.

Cast 
 Amparo Noguera as Clara Arancibia
 Francisco Reyes Morandé as Santiago Goycolea - Villain Principal
 Francisco Melo as Antonio Fuenzalida - Villain (†)
 Marcelo Alonso as Francisco Valenzuela
 Andrés Velasco as Padre Miguel Goycolea (†)
 Matías Oviedo as Manuel Carvacho
 Patricia Rivadeneira as Maite Soler
 Viviana Rodríguez as Renata Arancibia - Villain
 Claudia Pérez as Fiscal Loreto Rodríguez (†)
 Santiago Tupper as Hans Troncoso - Villain
 Andrea Velasco as Denisse Moya
 Matías Assler as Ignacio Goycolea (†)
 Pedro Campos as Gabriel Castro
 Josefina Fiebelkorn as Isidora Goycolea
 Jorge Arecheta as Pablo Valenzuela
 Fernanda Ramírez as Florencia Goycolea
 Constanza Contreras as Catalina Echeñique - Villain

Special participations 
 Stavros Mosjos as Claudio Menéses
 Catalina Vera as Ingrid Parra
 Rommy Salinas as Sofia Herrera
 Juan José Gurruchaga as Felipe Zabela
 Trinidad González as Norma Castro - Villain (†)
 Remigio Remedy as Diego Manzur
 Carlo Bravo as Alfredo Salgado - Villain (†)
 Mireya Sotoconil as Graciela Muñoz (†)
 Gabrio Cavallo as Mario
 Felipe Pinto as Detective Astorga (†)

References

External links 
  

2014 telenovelas
2014 Chilean television series debuts
2014 Chilean television series endings
Chilean telenovelas
Spanish-language telenovelas
Televisión Nacional de Chile telenovelas